The Henry Spencer Smith House is located in Neenah, Wisconsin.

History
Henry Spencer Smith was a son of pioneer and industrialist Elisha D. Smith. Located within the East Forest Avenue Historic District, the house was added to the National Register of Historic Places in 1982 and to the State Register of Historic Places in 1989. Currently, it serves as a hotel.

The nearby home of Smith's brother, known as the Charles R. Smith House, is also on both registers.

References

Houses on the National Register of Historic Places in Wisconsin
Hotel buildings on the National Register of Historic Places in Wisconsin
National Register of Historic Places in Winnebago County, Wisconsin
Colonial Revival architecture in Wisconsin
Shingle Style architecture in Wisconsin
Queen Anne architecture in Wisconsin
Limestone buildings in the United States